Lydiard may refer to:

Places in England
Lydiard Millicent, a Wiltshire village and parish, near the Borough of Swindon
Lydiard Tregoze, a Wiltshire village and parish, near the Borough of Swindon
Lydiard Park, formerly in the parish, now in the Borough of Swindon
Lydiard House

Surname
Arthur Lydiard (1917–2004), New Zealand runner and athletics coach
Charles Lydiard (d. 1807), Royal Navy officer

Christian name
Lydiard H. Horton (1879––1945), psychologist and author

Other uses
HMS Lydiard (1914), a destroyer of the Royal Navy